Eugene Seneta is Professor Emeritus, School of Mathematics and Statistics, University of Sydney, known for his work in  probability and non-negative matrices, applications and history. He is known for the variance gamma model in financial mathematics (the Madan-Seneta process). He was Professor, School of Mathematics and Statistics at the University of Sydney from 1979 until retirement, and an Elected Fellow since 1985 of the Australian Academy of Science. In 2007 Seneta was awarded the Hannan Medal in Statistical Science 
by the Australian Academy of Science, for his seminal work in probability and statistics; for his work connected with branching processes, history of probability and statistics, and many other areas.

References

 E. Seneta (2004). Fitting the variance-gamma model to financial data, Stochastic methods and their applications, J. Appl. Probab. 41A, 177–187.
 E. Seneta (2001). Characterization by orthogonal polynomial systems of finite Markov chains, J. Appl. Probab., 38A, 42–52.
Madan D, Seneta E. (1990). The variance gamma (v.g.) model for share market returns, Journal of Business, 63 (1990), 511–524.
 P. Hall and E. Seneta (1988). Products of independent normally attracted random variables, Probability Theory and Related Fields, 78, 135–142.
 E. Seneta (1974). Regularly varying functions in the theory of simple branching processes, Advances in Applied Probability, 6, 408–420.
 E. Seneta (1973). The simple branching process with infinite mean, I, Journal of Applied Probability, 10, 206–212.
 E. Seneta (1973). A Tauberian theorem of R. Landau and W. Feller, The Annals of Probability, 1, 1057–1058.

External links
 Eugene Seneta faculty page at U. of Sydney and list of publications.

Probability theorists
Australian statisticians
Fellows of the Australian Academy of Science
Living people
Year of birth missing (living people)